Pythium ultimum var. ultimum is a plant pathogen infecting potato.

References

External links
 Pythium Genome Database
 Index Fungorum
 USDA ARS Fungal Database

Water mould plant pathogens and diseases
Potato diseases
ultimum var. ultimum